Angelo Aimo (born 17 November 1964) is an Italian retired footballer. He played as midfielder.

References

1964 births
Living people
Footballers from Lombardy
Italian footballers
Association football midfielders
Serie B players
A.C. Perugia Calcio players
Alma Juventus Fano 1906 players
Modena F.C. players
A.C. Prato players
Cosenza Calcio 1914 players
Como 1907 players
F.C. Esperia Viareggio players
F.C. Ponsacco 1920 S.S.D. players